The 1913 Florida Gators football team represented the University of Florida during the 1913 Southern Intercollegiate Athletic Association football season. The season was George Pyle's fifth and last as the head coach of the Florida Gators football team.  Pyle's 1913 Florida Gators completed their eighth varsity football season with an overall record of 4–3 and their fourth year in the Southern Intercollegiate Athletic Association (SIAA) with a conference record of 2–2.

The 144–0 defeat of Florida Southern is the largest in school history.

Schedule

Season summary

Florida Southern
The  highlight of the Gators' 1913 campaign was an incredible 144–0 victory over Florida Southern. Back Harvey Hester played under an assumed name and scored 7 touchdowns. Former Gator William A. Shands refereed the contest. Louis Tenney scored five touchdowns; Swanson three, Moseley, J. B. Sutton, James Miller, Puss Hancock, Sam  Buie, and Rex Farrior had one each. It was freshman Farrior's first game at Florida.

Auburn

Sources:

The defeat of Florida Southern was followed five days later by a 55–0 loss to an Auburn Tigers team that finished its season undefeated and untied. Auburn scored five touchdowns in the first half. Captain Kirk Newell retired in the third period due to the heat.

The starting lineup was Henderson (left end), Coarsey (left tackle), Sutton (left guard), Price (center), Bullock (right guard), Ward (right tackle), Buie (right end), Swanson (quarterback), Lawler (left halfback), Hester (right halfback), Tenney (fullback).

Maryville
In the third week of play, Florida overwhelmed , 39–0, using several forward passes. Price made two field goals, including one of 40 yards.

Georgia Tech

Sources:

Coach John Heisman's Georgia Tech team defeated Florida 3–13. Heisman said the Gators played the best football he'd seen a Florida squad play. Florida scored first with a 30-yard placekick field goal from Price. In the third quarter, a 25-yard pass from Homer Cook to Cushman netted a touchdown for the Yellow Jackets. Cook scored again in the final period.

The starting lineup was Buie (left end), Coarsey (left tackle), Sutton (left guard), Price (center), Lotspeich (right guard), Hancock (right tackle), Henderson (right end), Mosley (quarterback), Tenney (left halfback), Hester (right halfback), Swanson (fullback).

South Carolina
The South Carolina Gamecocks beat Florida 13–0 in a steady rain. The Gamecocks resorted to using trick plays.

The Citadel

Sources:

The Gators defeated The Citadel 18–13 in a close game. Buie and Hester scored in the first period. Citadel came back in the second quarter with a long pass from Weeks to Bolton. In the third quarter, Buie blocked a Citadel kick, leading to another touchdown. Another pass got Citadel's final touchdown.

Mercer
The Gators also defeated the Mercer Baptists, 24–0, for their first win in six games against the Baptists. Captain Tenney was the feature of the contest.

Postseason
George Pyle finished his five-year tenure as the coach of the Florida Gators with an overall record of 26–7–3.   After leaving Florida, Pyle became the athletic director of the West Virginia Mountaineers. John Sutton was elected captain for next season.

Personnel

Line

Backfield

References

Bibliography
 
 

Florida
Florida Gators football seasons
Florida Gators football